Frederick Guy Harrison was dean of Belize from 1951 to 1953.

Harrison was born in 1909, educated at Queen's College, Birmingham and ordained deacon in 1929 and priest in 1930. After curacies at Little Lever, Weston and Tarporley he held incumbencies at Horbling and Threekingham before his time as dean; and Rillington, Scampston, York, Oakworth and Appleton Roebuck afterwards.

References

1909 births
Deans of Belize
Alumni of the Queen's Foundation
Year of death missing